Kathryn S Lilley is a professor of biochemistry at the University of Cambridge, director of the Cambridge Center for Proteomics, and an elected member of the European Molecular Biology Organization (EMBO).

Kathryn S Lilley has a PhD in Biochemistry from the University of Sheffield and, after leading a research laboratory at the University of Leicester, she became Professor of Cell Dynamics in the Department of Biochemistry at the University of Cambridge. Professor Lilley is known for her research in the study of dynamic changes in the cellular proteome and transcriptome, and the development of open-source software for the analysis and visualization of complex molecular data.

Her research activity has been recognized with the Wellcome Trust Investigator Award, the Juan Pablo Albar Proteome Pioneer Award from the European Proteomics Association (EuPA), and the Award for Distinguished Achievement in Proteomic Sciences from the Human Proteome Organization (HuPO).

References 

British biochemists

Year of birth missing (living people)
Living people
Members of the European Molecular Biology Organization
Alumni of the University of Sheffield
Academics of the University of Leicester
Academics of the University of Cambridge